The statue of Karel Havlíček Borovský is an outdoor sculpture in Žižkov, Prague, Czech Republic.

See also

 Karel Havlíček Monument

External links
 

Cultural depictions of Czech men
Monuments and memorials in Prague
Outdoor sculptures in Prague
Sculptures of men in Prague
Statues in Prague
Statues of writers
Žižkov